Erwin Hadewicz (born 2 April 1951) is a retired German football player. He spent nine seasons in the Bundesliga with FC Bayern Munich and VfB Stuttgart. As of May 2011, he works as a scout for VfB Stuttgart.

Honours
 European Cup winner: 1973–74
 Bundesliga champion: 1973–74

References

External links
 

1951 births
Living people
People from Ellwangen
Sportspeople from Stuttgart (region)
German footballers
Germany B international footballers
Bundesliga players
2. Bundesliga players
VfR Aalen players
FC Bayern Munich footballers
VfB Stuttgart players
Association football midfielders
Footballers from Baden-Württemberg